The Tyrfing Cycle is a collection of Norse legends, unified by the shared element of the magic sword Tyrfing. Two of the legends are found in the Poetic Edda, and the Hervarar saga can be seen as a compilation of these legends.

The forging and the curse
The first part deals with the forging of the sword Tyrfing by the Dwarves Durin and Dvalin. They are forced to do so by Svafrlami, the king of Gardariki, but in revenge they curse the sword so that it will kill a man every time it is unsheathed, cause three evil deeds and be the undoing of Svarflami.

Svafrlami is killed in single combat with the berserker Arngrim, who takes the sword and gives it to his son Angantyr.

The Battle on Samsø
The second part deals with the legend of Hjalmar, Orvar-Odd and the duel on Samsø. Arngrim's twelve sons meet Hjalmar and Orvar-Odd in a duel, but the outnumbered heroes kill Arngrim's sons. However, Hjalmar has been wounded by Tyrfing and dies.

Hervor
The third part deals with Angantyr's daughter Hervor and how she reclaims Tyrfing from her father's ghost. Later she marries and has the sons Angantyr and Heidrek.

Heidrek
The fourth part deals with the saga of Heidrek the wise, the king of the Goths, and contains the riddles of Gestumblindi. If the killing of Hjalmar may be the sword's first evil deed, its second is the accidental slaying of Heidrek's brother Angantyr. The third and last evil deed is probably when Heidrek's slaves murder Heidrek during an expedition in the Carpathians.

The Battle of the Goths and the Huns
The fifth part is about Heidrek's sons Angantyr and Hlöd and how Hlöd invades the land of the Goths with the Hunnish horde.

The history of Sweden
The last part is about Swedish history and its line of kings from Ivar Vidfamne until king Philip Halstensson.

Sources and Commentary
For links to source text in English translation and Old Norse and for general commentary see Hervarar saga ok Heiðreks.

See also
Volsung Cycle

References

 
Swedish legends
Norwegian legends